Reggie Bennett (born January 24, 1961) is an American former professional wrestler. She is best known for her work in joshi puroresu organizations such as All Japan Women's Pro-Wrestling.

Professional wrestling career 
Bennett began wrestling on the Californian independent circuit in 1986, primarily for the Independent Wrestling Federation, where she won the promotion's Women's Championship three times. Soon after, she was signed to the Ladies Professional Wrestling Association. Bennett participated in the LPWA Japan Title tournament during the February 23, 1992 pay-per-view LPWA Super Ladies Showdown, where she lost by disqualification in the semi-final round.

All Japan Women's Pro-Wrestling 
Bennett signed with All Japan Women's Pro-Wrestling in 1994 and competed there for several years. Bennett faced Chigusa Nagayo at the Big Egg Wrestling Universe show at the Tokyo Dome on November 20, 1994. She won the IWA World Women's Championship on May 15, 1995, defeating Manami Toyota. She lost the IWA Title later in 1995 to Takako Inoue. Bennett then went on to capture the All Pacific Championship by defeating Mariko Yoshida and then Kaoru Ito in a tournament on June 22, 1996, although she would again lose her title to Takako Inoue.

Extreme Championship Wrestling 
On April 12, 1997, Bennett was one of the featured speakers at a banquet honoring Terry Funk. The following night at ECW Barely Legal, she debuted as a member of Raven's Nest, interfering with the World Heavyweight Championship match between Funk and Raven.

Arsion and retirement 
On November 14, 1997, Bennett joined Arsion, forming a villainous faction of American wrestlers with newcomer Jessica Soto, who was billed as Reggie's younger sister Jessica Bennett.

On March 4, 2001, Bennett wrestled her retirement match against Manami Toyota.

Media

Filmography 
 Spacehunter: Adventures in the Forbidden Zone (1983) as "Barracuda Leader"
 Vendetta (1986) as "Conchita"
 Over the Top (1987) as "Female arm wrestler"
 Muscle Rock Madness (1992) as herself
 Mask de 41 (2004) as "Subzero Bennet"

Personal life 
Bennett married a Japanese musician named Kenji Ishihara in August 2000.

Championships and accomplishments 
 All Japan Women's Pro-Wrestling
 All Pacific Championship (1 time)
 IWA World Women's Championship (1 time)
 Independent Wrestling Federation
 IWF Women's Championship (3 times)

Mixed martial arts record

|-
| Loss
| align=center | 1-1
| Irina Rodina
| Submission (armbar)
| UTT – Women's Vale Tudo Championship Finals
| 
| align=center | 1
| align=center | 9:47
| Tokyo, Japan
|
|-
| Win
| align=center | 1-0
| Irma Verhoeff
| Submission (keylock)
| UTT – Women's Vale Tudo Championship Opening Round
| 
| align=center | 1
| align=center | 18:28
| Tokyo, Japan
|

References

External links 
 
 Reggie Bennett in LPWA
 Brian Rich Wrestling Archives-Womens title list
 Reggie Bennett at Online World of Wrestling
 
 

Living people
1961 births
American female mixed martial artists
Mixed martial artists utilizing wrestling
American female professional wrestlers
Professional wrestlers from California
21st-century American women